Vansan Movies is an Indian film production company established by Shan Sutharsan, CEO of Vansan Group, founded in 2015.

Film production
The company's first project titled Sethupathi (2016) directed by S. U. Arun Kumar starred Vijay Sethupathi and Remya Nambeesan in the lead roles. The film released worldwide on 19 February 2016, it received positive reviews from critics and was a commercial success. The production's next release was the comedy film, Enakku Vaaitha Adimaigal (2017), while Radha Mohan's Brindavanam was released in May 2017. Upcoming project Sindhubaadh was announced in March 2018, which revealed that S. U. Arun Kumar is all set to direct another venture starring Vijay Sethupathi as the protagonist and actress Anjali, later Yuvan Shankar Raja was onboard to compose music for the film. Vansan Movies was the Movie Distributor for the 2022 film Ponniyin Selvan Part 1 by Director Mani Ratnam.

Filmography

References

External links
 

Film production companies based in Chennai
Entertainment companies of India
2015 establishments in Tamil Nadu
Indian companies established in 2015
Entertainment companies established in 2015